Dan Weinberg is a former Democratic Party member of the Montana Senate, representing District 2 from 2004 to 2008.

External links
Montana Senate – Dan Weinberg official MT State Legislature website
Project Vote Smart – Senator Dan Weinberg (MT) profile
Follow the Money – Dan Weinberg
2006 2004 campaign contributions

Democratic Party Montana state senators
Living people
Politicians from Chicago
People from Whitefish, Montana
Hartwick College alumni
Year of birth missing (living people)